Beit Shikma (lit. House of Sycamore) is a moshav in southern Israel. Located near Ashkelon, it falls under the jurisdiction of Hof Ashkelon Regional Council.

History
The moshav was founded in 1950 by Jewish immigrants and refugees from Libya and Morocco. Built on the lands of the depopulated Palestinian Arab village of al-Jiyya, it was named after the large sycamore fig trees in the area.

References

Moshavim
Populated places established in 1950
Populated places in Southern District (Israel)
1950 establishments in Israel
Libyan-Jewish culture in Israel
Moroccan-Jewish culture in Israel